Private Kyle Brown is a former Canadian soldier convicted of manslaughter and torture in respect of the March 1993 death in custody of Somali teenager Shidane Arone.

The Canadian supply depot in Somalia was suspected to be a target for thieves. Arone was found hiding in an abandoned American base across from the Canadian base. He was cruelly detained, sodomized,  and tortured which ultimately led to his brutal murder by multiple Canadian Forces members. Master Corporal Clayton Matchee and Kyle Brown took 
lead roles in Arone's torture and murder.
The teenager's screams were reported to have been heard throughout the camp. Matchee was taken into custody, tried to hang himself, but only succeeded in causing himself irreversible brain damage.  
Because of this he was deemed unfit to stand trial. Brown, who played a secondary role, was convicted of manslaughter, and was sentenced to five years' imprisonment, along with Dismissal with Disgrace from the Canadian Forces.  He was released on parole after serving one-third of his five-year sentence.

Brown later published a book in which he presented a case wherein he had been made the scapegoat for the incident and the officers who had not intervened were not brought to justice.

An official inquiry in 1997 considered whether mefloquine, an anti-malarial drug that troops were taking, known to trigger psychotic symptoms in sensitive individuals, played a role in Arone's abuse, though the results were inconclusive.

References

Living people
Canadian people convicted of manslaughter
Year of birth missing (living people)